Shivaji Dev (born 20 September 1989) is an Indian actor working in Tamil language films, who made his debut in Venkatesh's Singakutty (2008).

Career
Shivaji Dev made his debut, credited as Junior Sivaji, in Venkatesh's masala film Singakutty (2008), starring alongside Gowri Munjal. The film opened to negative reviews from critics and fared poorly at the box office. In 2009 he joined Balu Mahendra's film institute and undertook a specialized acting course for a year and then started acting in theatrical plays. He garnered good reviews for his on-stage performances, including a role in The Importance of a Hat, where he played the role of an English butler, while also directing plays titled Merry Christmas and Growing up as a part of the Short & Sweet Theater Festival held in Chennai, India. He began work on another film Nandanam in mid 2012, featuring alongside Mithra Kurian and Rishi. However, despite completing schedules across Chennai, the film is yet to be complete and have a theatrical release. His second release was the coming-of-age film Pudhumugangal Thevai, where he played an aspiring film director. The film had a low key release in December 2012 and attracted negative reviews, though a critic noted Sivaji "shows potential".

In 2014, the actor was seen in AVM Productions' experimental drama film Idhuvum Kadandhu Pogum, where he played a widower. Having a straight to YouTube-release, the film attracted positive reviews from critics.

Personal life
His aunt is actress Sripriya, sister of his mother Meenakshi. He is married to actress Suja Varunee of Bigg Boss fame. In August 2019 Suja gave birth to their first child a baby boy name Adhvaarth.

Filmography

Television

Web series

References 

Living people
Film producers from Chennai
Male actors in Tamil cinema
Indian male film actors
21st-century Indian male actors
1989 births
Male actors from Chennai